The 401st "Iron Tracks" Brigade (Ikvot HaBarzel) is an Armored Brigade in the 162nd Division of the Israeli Defence Forces (IDF). Since August 2016 it is commanded by Colonel Ohad Nagma.

History
Established in 1966, 401 Brigade is one of the youngest brigades of the IDF.  It took its current form in 1985. 
The brigade was initially composed of the 46th and 195th Armored Battalions and the 52nd and 34th Infantry Battalions, which were eventually converted to armor. The 34th Battalion was eventually disbanded and re-established in 1988 as an anti-tank battalion, later designated as the 94th "Duchifat" (hoopoe) Mechanized Infantry Battalion. In 2002 it was returned to the brigade, and in 2005 was transferred to the Judea and Samaria Territorial Division.

War of Attrition
The brigade was formed by expanding and splitting the 14th Armored Brigade together with which they held the 160 kilometers long Suez Canal defensive line in Sinai. The brigade was the first to be equipped with American "Patton" M60 tanks.

Yom Kippur War
Along with the 188th Brigade on the Golan Heights the brigade suffered heavy losses in the early days of the war. the 195th Battalion אדם Adam belonged to the brigade in the war.

Seventies
The brigade was re-formed and returned to Sinai to continue much the same manner as it did before the war, it was included in the evacuation of Sinai under the Camp David peace agreement with Egypt, moving to the lower Jordan Valley. 
In 1981 195th Battalion was transferred to the 500th Armored Brigade, although a year later the brigade received the 9th Battalion.

Operation "Peace for the Galilee"/ Lebanon War
In the war the brigade took part as a part of the Eastern Corps through the Lebanon ridge. One of the brigade's battalions took part in the Sultan Yaakub engagement, making it all the way to the Beirut-Damascus highway.

Eighties and Nineties
The brigade alternated between varied infantry missions in the West Bank, mainly in the Jordan Valley, with tank missions in the Security Zone in south Lebanon.

2nd Intifada
Since 2000 the brigade has been serving in the Israeli occupied territories, doing mostly infantry and police duty. It has been re-equipping with Israeli-made Merkava tanks to replace the Magach.

2nd Lebanon war

In July 2006, when the 2006 Lebanon War broke, the 401st Brigade was among the first units to travel up north into battle. The brigade fought mostly in the Eastern zone, by the villages of Markabeh, Bint Jbeil and the Salooky Valley. The 401st Brigade lost 12 of its soldiers in battle, with four killed after their Puma armored engineering vehicle was struck; dozens were injured.

Operation Cast Lead
In 2009, the brigade played a vital role in the Operation Cast Lead. The brigade entered the Gaza Strip through the Netzarim Corridor and kept up its advance until it had reached the coast, effectively cutting the strip in half.

After the operation, the brigade resumed training.

Operation Protective Edge 
The Merkava Mk. IVm tanks of 401st Brigade (IDF) killed between 120-130 Hamas militants during the ground fighting phase of Operation Protective Edge, according to the IDF.

Units 
 9th "Eshet" Armor Battalion (Merkava Mk.4)
 46th "Shelah" Armor Battalion (Merkava Mk.4)
 52nd "Ha-Bok'im"/"The Breachers" Armor Battalion (Merkava Mk.4)
 601st "Asaf" Armored Engineer Battalion
 401st Reconnaissance Company
 298th "Eyal" Signal Company

References

Brigades of Israel
Central Command (Israel)